The Rev James Cartmell, D.D. (13 November 1810– 23 January 1887) was Master of Christ's College, Cambridge from 1849 to 1881.

He went to Carlisle Grammar School, after which he spent the rest of his life at Christ's. He was successively undergraduate, fellow and  tutor before his long mastership. While at Cambridge he was Worshipful Master of Isaac Newton University Lodge.

References 

1810 births
1881 deaths
People educated at Carlisle Grammar School
Fellows of Christ's College, Cambridge
Masters of Christ's College, Cambridge
Vice-Chancellors of the University of Cambridge
British Freemasons
Members of Isaac Newton University Lodge